Malia Johnston is a New Zealand choreographer and dance director who has created works for many of New Zealand's dance companies including Footnote Dance, the New Zealand Dance Company, and events such as the World of Wearable Arts and the Armistice centenary 11 November 2018.

Biography 
From 2007 to 2014 Jonston was artistic director for the World of Wearable Art Awards show. She directed the World of Wearable Art show which travelled to Hong Kong's International Arts Festival in 2012 and was creative director for the 30th anniversary season in 2018.

Johnston is a guest choreographer and tutor at the New Zealand School of Dance and a tutor in dance at Unitec Institute of Technology.

Companies that Johnston has choreographed for include Footnote Dance and the New Zealand Dance Company. She is one of the founders of the company Movement Of The Human.

Directing and choreographing performances for large public outdoor events is an area Johnston works in. This includes a performance at Pukeahu National War Memorial Park called He Wawa Waraki: Roaring Chorus for the New Zealand Ministry of Culture and Heritage that commemorated the 1918 armistice that marked the end of World War I. In 2021 Johnston directed the opening of The Performance Arcade What if the City Was a Theatre? programme in Wellington which was a collaboration with Johnston's company Movement of the Human, kapa haka group Hiwa, Wellington Opera, and singer Sharn Te Pou.

Awards 

 2013 Creative New Zealand Choreographic Fellowship.
 2018 Director of the Year, Wellington Theatre Awards for RUSHES (New Zealand Festival in association with Te Papa: Museum of New Zealand) and Meremere, a solo autobiographical show featuring Rodney Bell. Both produced by MOTH at Circa Theatre.

References 

Living people
New Zealand choreographers
Year of birth missing (living people)